Words & Music is the second album by the London-based Swingle II singers released in 1974 on the CBS label. The original Paris-based The Swingle Singers recorded regularly for Philips in the 1960s and early 1970s and the successor London-based group (Swingle II) continued to record, for Columbia/CBS, Virgin Classics and other record labels from 1974 to the present.

Track listing
Side 1
"The Windmills of Your Mind" (Alan and Marilyn Bergman, Michel Legrand) - 2:22
"The Way We Were" (A. Bergman, M. Bergman, Marvin Hamlisch) – 2:21
"Maple Leaf Rag ('Satchmo')" (Scott Joplin; arr. Tony Vincent Issacs) - 2:35
"Amazing Grace" (Traditional; arranged by Ward Swingle) - 4:17
”Killing Me Softly with His Song" (Norman Gimbel, Charles Fox) – 3:35

Side 2
"The Entertainer" (Joplin; arr. Isaacs) - 3:36
"Try to Remember" (Tom Jones, Harvey Schmidt) - 2:40
"The Fool on the Hill" (John Lennon, Paul McCartney) – 2:29
"Where Have All the Flowers Gone" (Pete Seeger) – 2:53
"Bridge over Troubled Water" (Paul Simon) – 4:23

Singers
Mary Beverley & Olive Simpson – sopranos
Carol Hall & Linda Hirst – contraltos
John Potter & Ward Swingle – tenors
John Lubbock & David Beavan - basses

Musicians
Ward Swingle – keyboards
Daryl Runswick – bass guitar 
Chris Karan - drums

Production
Arrangements and adaptions: Ward Swingle
Producers: Ward Swingle & Terry Edwards
Recorded at: CBS Studios, London
Engineer: Bernie O’Gorman
Album art direction: Roslav Szaybo (CBS Records)
Album photography: Colin Gibbs & Alan Jones

References

CBS S 80554 original album sleeve notes

The Swingle Singers albums
1974 albums
CBS Records albums